Daytona USA 2001, known in North America as Daytona USA, is a racing arcade game developed by Sega and Genki which is a complete revamp of Daytona USA for release on the Dreamcast platform. This version features every single course from the original Daytona USA game and the Championship Circuit Edition. Three new tracks were specially designed for Daytona USA 2001, and all of the tracks are playable normally, in reverse, mirrored, or in reverse-mirrored mode.

The game's graphics were significantly updated from previous home installments of Daytona USA, more resembling the likes of Daytona USA 2. It was also playable online, allowing for competition between up to four players and uploading/downloading of best times and ghost car information, although the online options were removed from the PAL version. The Dreamcast's online servers for both Alien Front Online and Daytona USA 2001 were taken down permanently by mistake as a result of the developers hard-coding the IP-address to the servers in the game and Sega giving away a network block that belonged to AT&T.
Another addition to Daytona USA 2001 was the Championship mode, where the player must place above a certain point in the overall rankings to progress, culminating in the King of Daytona Cup.

Gameplay
Daytona USA 2001 retains three tracks from Daytona USA and two from Daytona USA: Championship Circuit Edition, while adding three new and exclusive circuits. All of them can be played in four variants: mirror, mirror reverse, reverse and normal. Several game modes are available: single race, championship, time trial and 2 players with split screen. Only four cars can be used at the start, with the possibility of unlocking more as the progress is made.

The courses taken from Daytona USA: Championship Circuit Edition do not have their original themes; instead, new songs are used in place of Funk Fair, The Noisy Roars of Wilderness, and Pounding Pavement. Race to the Bass and the Daytona USA Medley do not appear either. The new songs are not given names in-game, and with the lack of an official soundtrack CD it is assumed they are named after their respective courses.

In addition to the above themes, Daytona USA 2001 also features different remixed music for the mirror and mirror-reversed versions of the courses. Theme music from the original Daytona USA arcade machine is selected at random and used as title screen music - these songs can be found in the Sound Test from track 48 onwards.

Reception

Randy Nelson reviewed the Dreamcast version of the game for Next Generation, rating it three stars out of five, and stated that "it's definitely not very deep, but for sheer arcade thrills, Daytona USA dutifully delivers".

The game was met with positive reception upon release, as it holds a score 86 out of 100 on Metacritic. In Japan, Famitsu gave it a score of 31 out of 40.

References

External links 

2000 video games
Amusement Vision games
Daytona USA
Dreamcast games
Dreamcast-only games
Genki (company) games
Racing video games
Sega video games
Video game remakes
Video games developed in Japan
Multiplayer and single-player video games